Johnstons Creek may refer to:

 Johnstons Creek (New South Wales), a former creek, now canal, in Sydney, Australia
 Johnston Creek (Alberta), a creek and canyon in Banff National Park, Alberta, Canada

See also
Johnston River, a river in Western Australia